The 1997 FIA GT Championship was the inaugural season of FIA GT Championship, an auto racing series endorsed by the Fédération Internationale de l'Automobile (FIA) and organized by the Stéphane Ratel Organisation (SRO). The FIA GT Championship replaced the BPR Global GT Series which had been held races and championships from 1994 to 1996 after the series was promoted by the FIA, while Stéphane Ratel took over as promoter and organizer of the new championship, replaced the former BPR Organisation after the departure of partners Jürgen Barth and Patrick Peter.  The races featured grand touring cars conforming to two categories of regulations, GT1 and GT2, and awarded driver and team championships in each category.  The season began on 13 April 1997 and ended on 26 October 1997 after 11 rounds, visiting Europe, Japan, and the United States.

Bernd Schneider and his AMG Mercedes team won the GT1 Drivers' and Teams' Championships, while Justin Bell and Viper Team Oreca secured the GT2 titles.

Schedule
For the new international championship, much of the calendar was new.  The Nürburgring, Spa, Silverstone, and Suzuka's endurance event were all retained, but much of the European calendar was new to the series.  Donington Park replaced Brands Hatch as the second British round, while Hockenheimring was added as a second German event.  Mugello took over from Monza in Italy, and A1-Ring also brought the series to Austria for the first time.  A street circuit in Helsinki was unique to the calendar, and served as the first race of a shorter three-hour duration.  Two American events of a three-hour duration replaced the former season-ending fly-away race in China, visiting Sebring and Laguna Seca.

Entries

GT1

GT2

Results and standings

Race results

Points were awarded to the top six finishers in each category.  Entries were required to complete 75% of the race distance in order to be classified.

Driver championships

GT1

GT2

Team championships

Teams score points for all cars that finish each round of the championship. Cars must complete at least 75% of the race distance to be classified.

GT1

GT2

References

External links

 Official FIA GT homepage
 1997 FIA GT Championship race results
 1997 FIA GT Championship images Retrieved from www.racingsportscars.com on 24 August 2009
 1997 FIA GT Championship Classifications Retrieved from web.archive.org on 24 August 2009
 1997 FIA GT Championship points tables Retrieved from web.archive.org on 24 August 2009
 Grand Touring Car Technical Regulations Retrieved from web.archive.org on 25 August 2009

FIA GT
FIA GT Championship seasons